Anadenanthera colubrina var. colubrina is a tree native to Argentina and Brazil.  Common names for it include Angico, Angico-brabo-liso, Angico-cambui, Angico-coco, Angico-escuro, Angico-liso, Angico-vermelho, Aperta-ruao and Cambui-angico.

Growth
Anadenanthera colubrina var. colubrina normally grows to a height of about 10–20 m, but occasionally it will be seen up to 30 m tall. It can be found growing at an altitude of 100–1200 m in areas with 1200–2000 mm/year annual rainfall.

The tree's bark has a thickness of about 4–10 mm.  The outside surface is nearly smooth.  It is gray, black speckled and resembles snake skin, after which it was once given a scientific designation.

Uses
The wood is hard to very hard and it has a density of 0.80-1.10 g/cm3. It is used for firewood, charcoal, floors, beams, posts, stakes, boat construction and general construction.

References

colubrina var. colubrina
Trees of Argentina
Trees of Brazil